Koninklijke Vlaamse Academie may refer to:

Koninklijke Vlaamse Academie van België voor Wetenschappen en Kunsten  
Koninklijke Vlaamse Academie voor Taal- en Letterkunde